Color Me Dead is a 1969 Australian thriller directed by Eddie Davis, starring American actors Tom Tryon, Carolyn Jones and Rick Jason. It is a remake of the 1950 film D.O.A.. Due to the failure on renewing copyright of D.O.A., the content of D.O.A. became the property of United States public domain. Thus, the content of Color Me Dead could have been exactly the same as D.O.A.

Plot
Lawyer Frank Bigelow discovers he has been poisoned and has only weeks to live. He spends the time tracking down his own murderer.

The starting scenes from George Raynolds (Raymond Rakubian) was stealing a piece of iridium and selling it to Mr. Phillips. At the same time, Mr. Bigelow prepared to go for a one-week vacation, due to Mr. Bigelow (the accountant) did not get along well with his girlfriend (the secretary, Paula). While George and Philips were trading the iridium, they asked Mr. Bigelow to notarize the transaction.

After Mr. Bigelow arrived at the place of vacation, he went to a nightclub called "Pink Panther" with a couple he meets in the hotel. However, he did not notice that someone had changed his drink while he was talking with a charming lady at the nightclub. After he went back to the hotel, he felt a stomachache and went to hospital. The doctor explained he was being poisoned by a luminous toxin and no antidote had been found yet. How much time he left in the world is difficult to predict, but for sure it will be less than a week. After Bigelow felt the diagnosis is true and the doctor mentioned someone wanted him dead, Bigelow decided to find out who killed him. Meanwhile, Bigelow received a call from Paula that Mr. Phillips had tried to reach him many times. However, Bigelow had no idea about who Philipps was until Paula told Bigelow he committed suicide.

To find the person who is trying to kill people, Mr. Bigelow went to Sydney and met Mr. Philips's controller (Mr. Halliday) and secretary Miss Foster. They told Mr. Bigelow that Philips committed suicide by jumping from his apartment. To make sure whether Philips died by suicide or something else, Mr. Bigelow went Philips's house, but Philip's wife and relatives did not know anything about it. At this time, Miss Foster provided some important information, which is Philips had called a model (Marlo Stevens) before he died. Using this information, Mr. Bigelow finally found the person who tried to buy the iridium — Bradley Taylor.

Bradley explained he was doing business, though he was deceived by Philips and his nephew George, because Bradley finally found out his nephew stole his iridium to sell to Philips, and Philips sold it to Bradley again. Therefore, at this time, Mr. Bigelow came to ask why he was trying to kill Philips and the others, Bradley is very angry and feels like Bigelow knows too much. Thus, Bradley asked his subordinates to kill Bigelow, though Bigelow already is a dead person.

Luckily, Bigelow escaped Bradley's attempt, and went back to Philips' home, but he found Mrs. Phillips and her brother had been poisoned, as well. He had been told Philips' controller (Mr. Halliday) had been here before. Now, he realized the first person who was trying to kill him is Philips' controller. Because after Philips sold the iridium to Bradley, Philips got $60,000 and Halliday stole it. After Bradley found the problem with his iridium, he wanted to get the money back from Philips. Halliday already took the money, though, and to avoid Phillips, he told Bradley the truth, and decided to kill the persons who knew of the transaction. Bigelow, with little time to live, killed Halliday and went to the police office.

Cast 
 Tom Tryon as Frank Bigelow
 Carolyn Jones as Paula Gibson
 Rick Jason as Bradley Taylor
 Pat Connolly as Marla Rukubian
 Tony Ward as Halliday
Penny Sugg as Miss Foster
Reg Gillam as Eugene Phillips
Margot Reid as Mrs Phillips
Peter Sumner as Stanley Phillips
Michael Laurence as George Reynolds
Sandy Harbutt as Chester
John Dease as Doctor Matson
Tom Oliver as Doctor McDonald
Phil Haldemann as Hotel Clerk

Production
The film was the second of three movies Eddie Davis made in Australia for Reg Goldsworthy: It Takes All Kinds, Color Me Dead, and  That Lady from Peking. Shooting began in September 1968 and took place in Mittagong, Surfers Paradise and Sydney. The common feature of these three movies is that the main actors are Americans and the Australian company Goldsworthy Productions provided the other resources of the movie, such as the $500,000 budget.

Reception
The film was poorly received critically and commercially. Although the main actors, Tom Tryon and Carolyn Jones, have already won some cinematic achievements and rewards before they joined this movie, in fact, the movie Color Me Dead did not show any big impact on their film careers.

Nan Musgrove has evaluated that "'Color Me Dead', the Goldsworthy Productions film which, it is expected, will be a boost to the Australian movie industry, is one of the few films I have watched being made. On its budget of $500,000 it is an accomplishment and more than pleasantly surprised the experts."

See also
 D.O.A. – 1988 American remake of the 1950 film
 Kate – 2021 American remake of the 1950 film

References

External links 
 
Color Me Dead at TCMDB
Color Me Dead at Oz Movies

1969 films
1960s thriller films
Remakes of American films
Films directed by Eddie Davis
Australian action adventure films
1960s English-language films